Dual player or dual star is a term used in Hiberno-English to describe someone who competes in multiple sports — for example, in Victorian Ireland, cricket and hurling. The term today in Gaelic games typically describes a male player who plays both Gaelic football and hurling or, if a female player, a player of ladies' Gaelic football and camogie. The player does not necessarily have to play at the same standard in both sports. The number of dual stars at county level has decreased recently due to the increasing demands placed upon the best players of both sports.

List of dual players with All-Ireland titles

In 1990, Teddy McCarthy of Cork became the first player to win both a football and a hurling All-Ireland in the same year.

Ex-Taoiseach Jack Lynch won one football and five hurling All-Irelands with Cork during the 1940s.

List of dual players with All Stars in both codes
A few players have won All Star Awards in both codes. These include:
 Jimmy Barry-Murphy
 Ray Cummins
 Liam Currams
 Brian Murphy

Ray Cummins has uniquely won an All Star Award in both hurling and Gaelic football in the same year, 1971.

Ladies' Gaelic football/camogie

Dual county
Dual county is a similar term for counties that have teams that play at the same level in both football and hurling.

Dual manager
The definition of a dual manager is Anthony Cunningham.

References

 
Gaelic games terminology
Lists of Gaelic football players
Lists of hurling players